Georgi Jovicic (born 6 February 1996, in Vrbas) is a professional soccer player who plays for Brantford Galaxy SC of the Canadian Soccer League. Born in Yugoslavia, he represented Canada at international level.

Notes

External links

canadiansoccerleague.ca

1996 births
Living people
People from Vrbas, Serbia
Association football goalkeepers
Canadian soccer players
Brantford Galaxy players
Serbian expatriate sportspeople in Canada
Expatriate soccer players in Canada
Canadian Soccer League (1998–present) players